Eureka Springs is a city in Carroll County, Arkansas, United States, and one of two county seats for the county. It is located in the Ozark Mountains of northwest Arkansas, near the border with Missouri. As of the 2020 census, the city population was 2,166.

In 1970 the entire city, as of its borders at that time, was listed on the National Register of Historic Places as the Eureka Springs Historic District. Eureka Springs has been selected as one of America's Distinctive Destinations by the National Trust for Historic Preservation. Eureka Springs was originally called "The Magic City", "Little Switzerland of the Ozarks", and later the "Stairstep Town" because of its mountainous terrain and the winding, up-and-down paths of its streets and walkways.

It is a tourist destination for its unique character as a Victorian resort, which first attracted visitors to use its then believed healing springs. The city has steep winding streets filled with Victorian-style cottages and manors. The historic commercial downtown of the city has an extensive streetscape of well-preserved Victorian buildings. The buildings are primarily constructed of local stone, built along limestone streets that curve around the hills, and rise and fall with the topography in a five-mile long loop. Some buildings have street-level entrances on more than one floor and other such oddities: the Basin Park Hotel has its front entrances on the floor below first, and a ground-level emergency exit in the back of the building on the fifth floor. The streets wind around the town, with few intersecting at right angles. There are no traffic lights.

History

19th century
Native American legends tell of a Great Healing Spring in the Eureka Springs area. People of various indigenous cultures long visited the springs for this sacred purpose. The hills and valleys of the area are ancestral lands of the historic Osage Nation, and bands of Delaware and Shawnee peoples also lived in the area before the federal government conducted Indian removal further west.

The European Americans also believed that the natural springs had healing powers. After European Americans arrived, they described the waters of the springs as having magical powers. Dr. Alvah Jackson was credited in American history with locating the major spring, and in 1856 claimed that the waters of Basin Spring had cured his eye ailments. Dr. Jackson established a hospital in a local cave during the Civil War and used the waters from Basin Spring to treat his patients. After the war, Jackson marketed the spring waters as "Dr. Jackson's Eye Water".

In 1879 Judge J.B. Saunders, a friend of Jackson, claimed that his crippling disease was cured by the spring waters. Saunders started promoting Eureka Springs to friends and family members across the state and created a boomtown. Within a period of little more than one year, the city expanded from a rural spa village to a major city. Within a short time in the late 19th century, Eureka Springs had become a flourishing city, spa and tourist destination.

On February 14, 1880, Eureka Springs was incorporated as a city. Thousands of visitors came to the springs based on Saunders's promotion, and covered the area with tents and shanties. In 1881, Eureka Springs enjoyed the status of Arkansas's fourth-largest city, and by 1889 it had become the second largest city, behind Little Rock.

Early African-American residents were freedmen who had moved to the city from farms where they were previously enslaved. Some visited for employment or for health benefits and stayed. During decades of segregation, Black-owned hotels were available for Black visitors, who were prohibited from whites-only lodging. A school and African Methodist Episcopal (AME) Pilgrim's Chapel were established in the 1890s by the Black community. Segregation increased in the area after the United States Supreme Court ruling in Plessy v. Ferguson, allowing "separate but equal" facilities. African Americans were banned from all springs except Hardy Spring.

After his term as a Reconstruction-era governor of Arkansas, Republican Powell Clayton moved to the strongly Unionist Eureka Springs in 1872 and began promoting the city and its commercial interests. Clayton marketed the town as a retirement community for the wealthy. Eureka Springs soon became known for gracious living and a wealthy lifestyle.

In 1882, the Eureka Improvement Company was formed to attract a railroad to the city. With the completion of the railroad, Eureka Springs became a more accessible destination and became known as a vacation resort. In two years, thousands of homes and commercial enterprises were constructed. The Crescent Hotel was built in 1886 and the Basin Park Hotel in 1905. In 1892, the New Orleans Hotel and Spa was built along Spring Street. In the 21st century, it operates as an all-suite hotel, furnished with Victorian furniture and art.

These many Victorian buildings have been well preserved, forming a coherent streetscape that has been recognized for its quality. Some continue to be operated for their original purposes others have been adapted for other uses.

20th century
The Ozarka Water Company was formed in Eureka Springs in 1905. Carrie Nation moved there toward the end of her life, founding Hatchet Hall on Steele Street. The building was later operated as a museum, but is now closed.

The only bank robbery to occur in Eureka Springs was on September 27, 1922, when five outlaws from Oklahoma tried to rob the First National Bank. Three of the men were killed and the other two wounded. Today it is reenacted every year during the antique car parade which is NW Arkansas’ longest running car show and was started by Bobby Ball and Frank Green. In 2018 it celebrated its 48th year.

Economic decline, racial segregation and discrimination, Klan activities, and collapse of tourism during World War I resulted in a slow decline of the African-American community through the 1920s and 1930s. The AME church disbanded in 1925. Mattie, Alice, and Richard Banks, descendants of the African-American Fancher family, which had long been associated with the city, continued to reside there until their deaths in 1966, 1969, and 1975, respectively.

Opera in the Ozarks at Inspiration Point was founded in 1950. The organization continues to present an annual summer opera festival in Eureka Springs.

In 1964, Gerald L.K. Smith began building a religious theme park named Sacred Projects that was proposed to include a life size recreation of Jerusalem. The project never fully developed but two of the components are major city-defining projects today—the seven-story Christ of the Ozarks statue designed by Emmet Sullivan and the nearby The Great Passion Play performed during the summer. It is regularly performed from May through October by a cast of 170 actors and dozens of live animals. The script of The Great Passion Play has been altered from the original, which set Jesus's beating at Herod's court and included a monologue blaming his death on the Jews. It has been seen by an estimated 7.7 million people, which makes it the largest-attended outdoor drama in the United States, according to the Institute of Outdoor Theatre of the University of East Carolina at Greenville, North Carolina. Christian-themed attractions have been added in association with the drama production. These include a New Holy Land Tour, featuring a full-scale re-creation of the Tabernacle in the Wilderness; a section of the Berlin Wall; and a Bible Museum featuring more than 6,000 Bibles. (Items include an original 1611 King James Bible, a leaf from a Gutenberg Bible, and the only Bible signed by all of the original founders of the Gideons.)

Isolation and affordable property made Eureka Springs an attractive back-to-the-land destination for hippies, counterculture radicals, and lesbian separatists in the late 1960s and 1970s. While first facing resistance from many locals, as businesses were established and increased tourism, so did mutual respect. The accepting environment fostered a network of gay and lesbian business owners, and the town became known as a resort town for LGBT tourism. During the AIDS crisis, community members formed the Ozark AIDS Resources and Service to distribute mutual aid and care. Eureka Springs suffered stronger impacts than other parts of the state, and the community lost many leaders and establishments. 

Architect E. Fay Jones designed Thorncrown Chapel in 1980, and it was selected for the "Twenty-five Year Award" by the American Institute of Architects in 2006. The award recognizes structures that have had significant influence on the profession. The chapel was listed on the National Register of Historic Places in 2000 because of the special nature and quality of its architecture.

21st century
On May 10, 2014, Eureka Springs became the first city in Arkansas to issue marriage licenses to same-sex couples. On May 12, 2015, Eureka Springs passed a Non-Discrimination Ordinance (Ord. 2223), with voters choosing 579 for to 261 against.

It became the first city in Arkansas to have such a law to cover LGBT residents and tourists.
But a state law intended to invalidate the anti-discrimination ordinance went into effect July 22, 2015.

This Intrastate Commerce Improvement Act, sponsored by state senator Bart Hester, “prohibits cities from passing civil rights ordinances that extend protections beyond those already afforded by state law." In response, the town's mayor stated that they would be "prepared to defend their ordinance in court.”

Geography
Eureka Springs is located in western Carroll County. The center of the city is in a narrow valley at the headwaters of Leatherwood Creek, a north-flowing tributary of the White River. Houses and streets climb both sides of the valley to the surrounding ridgecrests. U.S. Route 62 runs along a ridgecrest through the southern part of the city and leads east  to Berryville and west  to Rogers. Arkansas Highway 23 is Main Street through the center of Eureka Springs and leads north  to the Missouri state line.

The city was founded when the springs at this location were more evident. Over-extraction of water from the springs has greatly diminished their flow rates. All of the more than 140 springs in the town are cold-water springs.

Climate
The climate in this area is characterized by hot, humid summers and generally mild to cool winters. According to the Köppen Climate Classification system, Eureka Springs has a humid subtropical climate, abbreviated "Cfa" on climate maps.

Demographics

2020 census

As of the 2020 United States census, there were 2,166 people, 970 households, and 501 families residing in the city.

2000 census
As of the census of 2000, there were 2,278 people, 1,119 households, and 569 families residing in the city. The racial makeup of the city was 93.94% White, 0.04% Black or African American, 0.70% Native American, 0.79% Asian, 0.09% Pacific Islander, 2.28% from other races, and 2.15% from two or more races. 3.99% of the population were Hispanic or Latino of any race.

There were 1,119 households, of which 19.2% had children under the age of 18 living with them, 37.4% were married couples living together, 10.9% had a female householder with no husband present, and 49.1% were classified as non-families by the United States Census Bureau. Of 1,119 households, 250 were unmarried partner households: 50 heterosexual, 110 same-sex male, and 90 same-sex female households. 41.0% of all households were made up of individuals, and 13.4% had someone living alone who was 65 years of age or older. The average household size was 1.97 and the average family size was 2.64.

In the city the population was spread out, with 17.2% under the age of 18, 5.8% from 18 to 24, 24.4% from 25 to 44, 33.4% from 45 to 64, and 19.3% who were 65 years of age or older. The median age was 46 years. For every 100 females, there were 81.8 males. For every 100 females age 18 and over, there were 81.2 males.

The median income for a household in the city was $25,547, and the median income for a family was $40,341. Males had a median income of $27,188 versus $17,161 for females. The per capita income for the city was $18,439. About 4.4% of families and 12.2% of the population were below the poverty line, including 8.7% of those under age 18 and 13.0% of those age 65 or over.

Education

Public education
The community is supported by comprehensive public education from the Eureka Springs School District and its facilities:

 Eureka Springs High School (9–12)
 Eureka Springs Middle School (5–8)
 Eureka Springs Elementary School (PK–4)

Private education
Private school education is provided at:
 Clear Spring School (PK–12)
 The Academy of Excellence (PK–8)

Events

Eureka Springs hosts a variety of events throughout the year.

May Festival of the Arts is an annual month-long celebration of the arts in Eureka Springs. Events include the ArtRageous Parade, White Street Walk, Gallery Strolls, Taste of Art: A Visual Feast at local restaurants, Bank on Art at local banks, artist receptions, special events and exhibits, and much free music in Basin Park. 2013 marked the opening of the Eureka Springs Music Park: an interactive sound sculpture experience, in the North Main Park.

The Eureka Springs Food & Wine Festival is an annual fall event featuring fine cuisine and international wines. The 2012 event was November 8 to 11.

The Eureka Gras Mardi Gras Extravaganza was introduced in 2006 to kick off the Event Season with a New Orleans-style Mardi Gras celebration, complete with parades, floats, and masquerade balls. King's Day, in January, begins the celebration, which ends on the day of Mardi Gras, in February or March.

Eureka Springs holds an annual Halloween Festival. The town is already famous for its haunted houses and public buildings, its ghost tours, a Halloween extravaganza in the cemetery, "Voices from the Past" (in which live actors portray the dead of Eureka), and for a variety of ghostly phenomena.

There are four annual gay and lesbian events called "Diversity Weekends" which are held on the first weekend of April, August and November, along with a week long PRIDE celebration in June. The city also holds an annual UFO conference and several auto shows, including a Ford Mustang show in April, a Corvette show during the first weekend in October, and a Volkswagen show held in August.

Media

Radio and TV
For over-the-air television, Eureka Springs is served by the market based out of Springfield, Missouri. For cable, the Springfield affiliates can be received as well as a couple of stations in Fayetteville/Fort Smith as well as all four Little Rock stations. The local radio station is KESA.

Newspaper
 Carroll County News is published twice weekly, along with regional visitors guides.
 Lovely County Citizen is a tabloid that is distributed free. It publishes the Eureka Springs Visitors Guide.
 ES Independent (established in July 2012) is published in tabloid print format and distributed free.  
 Arkansas Democrat-Gazette Northwest Arkansas edition is the only daily newspaper distributed in the area.

In the media
The film Pass the Ammo was filmed in the city, with the Auditorium featured in several scenes. There are burn marks still visible on the Auditorium from the film's special effects. The movie Chrystal was filmed in Eureka Springs. Parts of the movie Elizabethtown were filmed in Eureka Springs. The 1982 miniseries The Blue and the Gray was filmed around the area. The SciFi Channel's reality series Ghost Hunters investigated the Crescent Hotel during episode 13 of the second season and found that the claims of ghosts in the hotel are true.

The 2018 documentary The Gospel of Eureka depicts the town and its unique culture, including the synergy of its religious and LGBTQ milieus.

The town is mentioned in the 2021 TV mini-series Dopesick, two lesbian characters in the series talk about wanting to move there.

Points of interest

 Blue Spring Heritage Center
 Christ of the Ozarks
 Crescent Hotel
 Eureka Springs & North Arkansas Railway
 Lake Leatherwood Park
 Thorncrown Chapel

Transportation
 U.S. Route 62
 Arkansas Highway 23

Notable people

Arts and culture
 Candace Camp, schoolteacher in Eureka Springs before becoming a romance novelist
 Frances Currey, folk art painter, spent her final years in a nursing home in Eureka Springs
 Elsie Bates-Freund, offered the Summer Art School of the Ozarks in Eureka Springs from 1940 to 1951, and lived in the city for part of the year for the rest of their lives
 Emme Gerhard, photographer; lived in Eureka Springs for a time
 Charles Christian Hammer classical guitarist; spent much of his life in Eureka Springs
 Irene Castle, silent film actress and ballroom dancer; spent her last years in Eureka Springs
 Crescent Dragonwagon, co-founded the Writer’s Colony at Dairy Hollow; lived in Eureka Springs for a number of years
 Ben Kynard, Ajax saxophonist; was born in Eureka Springs
 Glenn Gant, painter; resided much of his life in Eureka Springs
 Louis Freund, offered the Summer Art School of the Ozarks in Eureka Springs from 1940 to 1951; lived in Eureka Springs for many years
 Albert Quigley, designed, built, and lived in Quigley's Castle, just south of Eureka Springs
 Elise Quigley, designed, built and lived in Quigley's Castle, just south of Eureka Springs
 Rachel Beasley Ray, poet and author; lived in Eureka Springs for much of her life
 Ned Shank, co-founded the Writer's Colony at Dairy Hollow, lived in Eureka Springs for a number of years
 Marla Shelton, 1930s and 1940s film actress was born in Eureka Springs
 Jonathan Stalling, poet, Chinese literature expert; was raised in Eureka Springs
 Frank Stanford, poet, briefly lived in Eureka Springs

Business and politics
 Norman G. Baker, charlatan, ran a hospital that led to his conviction for mail fraud
 Powell Clayton, former Governor Arkansas, U.S. Senator, and later Ambassador to Mexico, was a prominent citizen and businessman in the 1880s and 1890s
 Claude A. Fuller, Arkansas and member of the United States House of Representatives, lived most of his life in, and was twice Mayor of, Eureka Springs
 Lizzie Dorman Fyler, women's rights activist, founded the Arkansas Woman Suffrage Association in 1881 while living in Eureka Springs
 Katherine Green, became the first female Mayor of Eureka Springs in 1966

Military
 Marcellus H. Chiles, United States Army Captain, Medal of Honor recipient, was born in Eureka Springs

Education
 Mary Carson Breckinridge, Frontier Nursing Service founder, taught at Crescent College and Conservatory while living in Eureka Springs

Religion
 William Evander Penn, Baptist minister, made his home in Eureka Springs in Penn Castle
 Gerald L. K. Smith, clergyman and populist political organizer retired to Eureka Springs, where he commissioned the Christ of the Ozarks

Sports
 Pat Burrell, Major League Baseball player, was born in Eureka Springs

Non-residents who died or were captured in Eureka Springs
 John Chisum, cattle baron, spent his last months in Eureka Springs
 Bill Doolin, Outlaw, member of the Wild Bunch gang; was captured in a Eureka Springs bathhouse in 1896
 James William Trimble, United States Representative; died in Eureka Springs in 1972
 Cadwallader C. Washburn, prominent businessman, soldier and politician; died in Eureka Springs in 1882

Gallery

References

External links
 

 
 Eureka Springs City Advertising & Promotion Commission
 Greater Eureka Springs Chamber of Commerce
  History and Photos of Eureka Springs
  Eureka Springs Merchants
 Eureka Springs, The Encyclopedia of Arkansas History and Culture
 Wind Chime Puts Arkansas Town in Guinness Records from National Public Radio
 

 
Cities in Arkansas
1880 establishments in Arkansas
Cities in Carroll County, Arkansas
County seats in Arkansas
Historic districts on the National Register of Historic Places in Arkansas
Hot springs of Arkansas
Populated places established in 1880
National Register of Historic Places in Carroll County, Arkansas